Mizerov is a district of the city of Karviná in Karviná District, Moravian-Silesian Region, Czech Republic. It was formerly an independent village but was later incorporated into Fryštát, and later Karviná. It lies in the historical region of Cieszyn Silesia and was first mentioned in a written document in 1618. Mizerov has a population of 15,624 (2001).

References 

Karviná
Villages in Karviná District
Neighbourhoods in the Czech Republic